is a Japanese retired track and field sprinter who specialized in the 100 metres. He competed in the 100 metres at the 2001 World Championships.

Personal bests

International competition

References

External links

Akihiro Yasui at Suzuki Athlete Club  (archived)

1977 births
Living people
Japanese male sprinters
Sportspeople from Shiga Prefecture
World Athletics Championships athletes for Japan
Competitors at the 1999 Summer Universiade
20th-century Japanese people